The Seelig-Byler House, also known as the Albert Seelig House, at 1920 N. Fourteenth St. in Coos Bay, Oregon, was built in about 1909.  It was listed on the National Register of Historic Places in 1994.

It was designed by local architect William S. "Bud" Turpen and is Bungalow/Craftsman architecture in style.

It is a two-story, cedar shingle-clad house.  It was built for Albert Seelig, "an enterprising German-born bookkeeper and collection agent for a
local liquor wholesaler."

References

National Register of Historic Places in Coos County, Oregon
Houses completed in 1909